Qushchi Mahalleh (also Romanized as Qūshchī Maḩalleh; also known as Qūchī Maḩalleh) is a village in Siyahrud Rural District, in the Central District of Juybar County, Mazandaran Province, Iran. At the 2006 census, its population was 106, in 30 families.

References 

Populated places in Juybar County